The Hugo is an alcoholic aperitif, originating in South Tyrol, but widespread in Triveneto, Austria, Switzerland and Germany, based of prosecco, elderflower syrup (or lemon balm syrup), seltzer (or sparkling water) and mint leaves.

Origins
As reported by the magazines Mixology and Der Spiegel, the Hugo was conceived in 2005 by Naturns barman Roland Gruber, as an alternative to Spritz Veneziano, and quickly spread beyond the borders of South Tyrol. Initially, the recipe provided for the use of lemon balm syrup, then in practice replaced by elderflower syrup, more easily available.

The name was chosen at random by its creator: initially he chose the name Otto, but he changed his mind because he did not think it was appropriate.

References

Italian alcoholic drinks
Cocktails with Prosecco